Thomas & Friends: The Adventure Begins is a 2015 British computer-animated adventure comedy film produced by HIT Entertainment and animated by Arc Productions. It serves as a prequel to the British television series, Thomas & Friends. It is based on the first two books of The Railway Series: The Three Railway Engines and Thomas the Tank Engine, which were previously adapted into the first seven episodes of the show's first season in 1984. It commemorates the 70th anniversary of The Railway Series, making it the first installment to officially adapt a Railway Series story since Series 4.

Joseph May and John Hasler take over the voice of Thomas the Tank Engine as new voice actor in the US and UK, respectively. Rob Rackstraw joins the US cast as James the Red Engine (he would join the UK cast later the same year), Keith Wickham takes over the role of Sir Topham Hatt in the US, and Christopher Ragland takes the role of the Troublesome Trucks in the UK and US, respectively. It also co-stars the voices of Tim Whitnall, Teresa Gallagher, William Hope and Kerry Shale, voice actors who were already working on the series at the time of the special's production. The production of the special itself was fast-tracked into Arc Productions' schedule for the franchise's 70th anniversary, and as a result, the 21st series of the show had eight episodes cut from its run when the Big World! Big Adventures! rebrand began development.

Plot

Gordon the Big Engine tells Edward the Blue Engine that Sir Topham Hatt has bought a new engine to shunt coaches. After helping Gordon up the hill with his goods train, Edward is shunting at Knapford Station when he hears James, another engine who is roughly Edward's size, talking to Thomas, Sir Topham Hatt's new tank engine. Gordon is rather skeptical of his size, which upsets him, until Sir Topham asks Edward to teach him how to work in the yard. Initially, Thomas occasionally gets in the way and sometimes causes minor accidents. He also cheekily whistles at Gordon one day while he is resting and wakes him up, much to Gordon's annoyance.

That stormy night at Tidmouth Sheds, Thomas meets Henry the Green Engine, whom Edward tells the story about the time he hid in a tunnel to get out of the rain, fearing it would ruin his paint. The following day, Thomas is sent to the Sodor Steamworks where he is repainted blue and given the number 1. Gordon tells Thomas that the last No. 1 engine was a vertical-boilered engine called a coffee pot and orders him to fetch his express coaches. Thomas accidentally tries to take two four-wheeled coaches called Annie and Clarabel, who belong to James, but take a liking to Thomas. Soon, seeing Henry at the water tower, Thomas asks him about his fear of the rain. Henry explains that the rain makes him nervous, but Thomas tries fruitlessly to convince him that there is nothing to be afraid of.

The following day, Thomas takes longer to start than usual and arrives at Knapford with Gordon's coaches later than usual. Still cross with Thomas for waking him up, Gordon starts sooner than expected before Thomas can be uncoupled. By the time Gordon reaches Wellsworth, Thomas is worn out and is uncoupled. The next day, he accidentally disturbs two breakdown cranes named Judy and Jerome who are only used for emergencies only.

The next morning, Henry is ill and Thomas, being the only engine left, is instead asked to pull his train. Unfortunately, Thomas starts too soon and leaves the coaches behind, much to Sir Topham Hatt's dismay. Thomas sadly returns and is coupled to the train, but the big engines tease him about it at Tidmouth Sheds later that night. Edward kindly offers to let Thomas take his goods train for him the next day. However, Thomas gets too excited to take Edward's advice about the Troublesome Trucks which leads him to almost have an accident after they push him down Gordon's Hill. Sir Topham Hatt arrives and tells Thomas he should have been more patient when listening to Edward so he could have learned about trucks. He then orders Thomas and Edward to stay in the yard until Thomas knows enough about trucks as Edward does. During this time, Thomas manages to help Henry overcome his fear of rain.

Later, Thomas and Edward are working when a frightened James rushes by because the Troublesome Trucks are pushing him and cause his wooden brake blocks to catch fire. Thomas chases after James and attempts to couple up behind him to stop him, but he fails and the trucks run James and themselves off the rails at a bend. Thomas returns to Knapford and fetches Jerome and Judy to rescue James, who he takes to the Steamworks. Later that night, everyone congratulates Thomas and Sir Topham Hatt announces that James will have proper brakes and a new coat of paint and Thomas will be rewarded with his own branch line. Everyone is happy for Thomas, except Gordon who asks who will fetch their coaches because tender engines don’t shunt until Sir Topham says the other engines will have to fetch their own coaches until he finds another small engine who can.

A few days later, James returns to the yard, painted red with new brakes and Thomas is given Annie and Clarabel to run his branch line. He travels around Sodor and when he arrives at Ffarquhar Station, he meets Glynn the "Coffee-Pot" Engine who tells him to look after the branch line and wear the number 1 with pride.

During the end credits as the song “Really Useful Engine” plays, book illustrations from “The Railway Series” are shown.

Songs
"He's a Really Useful Engine"
"Troublesome Trucks"

Voice cast

Critical reception
The special received generally positive reviews; Common Sense Media gave the film a 4/5, stating, "Expect infighting among some of the engines as personalities clash and a few fretful moments, but ultimately there are happy resolutions and increasingly strong friendships as a result."

References

External links

 The Adventure Begins at Internet Movie Database

2015 films
Animated films about friendship
Direct-to-video prequel films
Films set in the 1920s
Universal Pictures direct-to-video animated films
Mattel Creations films
2015 computer-animated films
2010s American animated films
British computer-animated films
American computer-animated films
2010s children's animated films
Films with screenplays by Britt Allcroft
2010s English-language films
2010s British films
British prequel films